Hypselobarbus bicolor is a species of cyprinid in the genus Hypselobarbus. Its habitat is in the Indian Western Ghats and it was described in 2016.

References

Fish of India
Cyprinid fish of Asia
Fish described in 2016
Cyprinidae